Kalgeh-ye Amir Sheykhi (also Romanized as Kalgeh-ye Amīr Sheykhī and Kalgāh-e Amīr Sheykhī; also known as Kalgah) is a village in Kuh Mareh Khami Rural District, in the Central District of Basht County, Kohgiluyeh and Boyer-Ahmad Province, Iran. At the 2006 census, its population was 57, in 15 families.

References 

Populated places in Basht County